The Masonic Temple is a historic Masonic Lodge located at Fort Wayne, Indiana.  It was designed by architect Charles R. Weatherhogg (1872–1937) and built in 1926.  It is a 12 story, rectangular Classical Revival style steel frame building faced with Indiana limestone.  The front facade features four five-story Ionic order columns alternating with window openings.

It was listed on the National Register of Historic Places in 1991.

References

External links

National Register of Historic Places in Fort Wayne, Indiana
Neoclassical architecture in Indiana
Masonic buildings completed in 1926
Clubhouses on the National Register of Historic Places in Indiana
Masonic buildings in Indiana
Buildings and structures in Fort Wayne, Indiana